Albert I. Prettyman (died 1963) was a coach and athletic administrator at Hamilton College. During his coaching career he was head coach of many sports including basketball, track and field and football, but the majority of for his coaching work was in ice hockey.   When he died the American Hockey Coaches Association called him "the father of college hockey." He was also director/coach of the 1936 USA Winter Olympics hockey team, winning the bronze medal.
Prettyman was a member of two Olympic Committees and the founder, and lasting member of, the NCAA Hockey Rules Committee.

Early life
Prettyman was born in Virginia. He attended International Young Men's Christian Association Training School (now known as Springfield College) in Springfield, Massachusetts, where he graduated in 1906. While there he briefly played on the school's ice hockey team.

College coach
After spending time at Columbia University and the Nichols School in Buffalo, New York, Prettyman moved to Hamilton College in Clinton, New York to teach physical education and coach.  At Hamilton, he coached numerous sports including football, track, basketball, baseball, and hockey.  He is best known for his work with the hockey team. He started the Hamilton hockey team in 1918 with the first rink a frozen over tennis court at Hamilton College. In 1921, Prettyman convinced the college to build the Russsell Sage Rink, an indoor hockey facility, by using a portion of a large donation from the Russel Sage Foundation. The rink is the oldest continuously operated college built covered arena in America.  Prettyman later became Hamilton's athletic director and from 1926 to 1946 the chairman of the ice hockey rules committee for the National Collegiate Athletic Association (NCAA).  He coached hockey at Hamilton from 1918 until 1943. After the Continentals shut down for World War II, he spent the 1943-44 season with Colgate before they too suspended play. He returned to Hamilton for two more seasons as head hockey coach after the war and finished his career with 153 wins, 93 losses and 8 ties.

1936 Olympics
Prettyman was the head coach/director for 1936 United States Hockey Team in the Winter Olympics in Garmisch-Partenkirchen, Germany. Prettyman led a team that included United States Hockey Hall of Fame member John Garrison. The team finished 6–2–1 record and a bronze medal including a tie with eventual gold medal winner Great Britain.  

Coach Prettyman and the US hockey team got into an incident with Adolf Hitler the evening before the US-German Hockey game. Hitler was upset with the fact the US team did not acknowledge him with customary Nazi salute during the opening ceremony.  Hitler told the team in German, “We will beat your American team on the ice tomorrow.” backup Goalie, Francis Baker, who was acting as translator, responded in German, “We will not only beat Germany in hockey tomorrow; the United States will always defeat Germany.”  The next day the U.S. beat Germany 1-0 in a snowstorm on an outdoor rink.In fitting retribution, Francis Baker continued his studies at Hamilton after the Olympics, became a doctor and landed as a medic on the beaches of Normandy in 1944 to make good on his locker room  promise to Hitler eight years earlier.

Legacy
Prettyman died in 1963.  Shortly after his death, the American Hockey Coaches Association called him "the father of college hockey."  Even before he died Prettyman was the first person elected to the American Hockey Coaches Association’s Hall of Fame.  Hamilton College honors him each year by awarding the Albert I. Prettyman Award to the player “who demonstrated outstanding dedication, determination, and desire. His attitude has proven to be not only an asset to his team, but an inspiration to his teammates and coaches.”

Prettyman started a 100 year hockey legacy at Hamilton College, as well as a long hockey history in the greater Clinton, New York area including Clinton High School (90+ Years) and professional hockey (70 years) currently with the Utica Comets). In February 2018, a large centennial celebration (named "Thank You, Albert Prettyman) was held at Hamilton College and Clinton, New York, to recognize 100 years since Coach Prettyman introduced hockey to the area.  In attendance at the 100 year celebration was Stan Fischler, MSG hockey maven and winner of the Lester Patrick Award;  Guy Hebert, NHL Goalie who played at Hamilton College and Pat Kelly, coach of the legendary Clinton Comets E.H.L team .This celebration led to the Clinton Arena being named Kraft Hockeyville's best small hockey town in America later in 2018.

College Head coaching record

References

External links
 International Young Men's Christian Association Training School 1906 Graduating Class photo - Springfield College Archives Digital Collections

Year of birth missing
1963 deaths
Colgate Raiders men's ice hockey coaches
Hamilton Continentals athletic directors
Hamilton Continentals football coaches
Springfield College (Massachusetts) alumni
Sportspeople from Virginia